Wilhelm Knop (28 July 1817 – 28 January 1891) was a German agrochemist and co-founder of modern water culture. Together with Julius von Sachs he identified Nitrogen, Phosphorus, Sulfur, Potassium, Calcium, Magnesium and Iron as essential elements of plant nutrition. Knop and von Sachs were the first to use standardized nutrient solutions in experimental plant physiology.

Knop's solution, which consists of his four-salt mixture and traces of an iron salt, is still commonly used in plant biology today. Dennis Robert Hoagland and Daniel Israel Arnon proposed that Sachs' solution (1860), Knop's solution (1865), Pfeffer's solution (1900), and Crone's solution (1902) should be supplemented with Boron, Manganese, Zinc, Copper and Molybdenum for best results with water culture experiments.

For Knop, the cultivation of crops in nutrient solutions was primarily a method for discovering scientific laws, a principle shared by Dennis Hoagland. For determining the effectiveness of mineral fertilizers, he regarded the field experiment as the authoritative method of investigation. The names of Hoagland and Knop are commonly used as a brand for an innovative product, namely the Hoagland and Knop Medium, which has been specially formulated for plant cell, tissue and organ cultures on agar.

References 

 

1817 births
1891 deaths
19th-century German chemists
People from Goslar (district)